Screaming Targets is the fourth studio album by Australian pop rock band Jo Jo Zep & The Falcons. The album was the band's first via Mushroom Records. Released in July 1979, the album peaked at number 13 on the Australian Kent Music Report, becoming the band's first top twenty album. The album was released with a limited edition bonus record featuring songs recorded live at Sentimental Bloke Hotel, Bombay Rock, Melbourne, April 1979.

The US release, detailed below, differed slightly from the original Australian issue, and did not appear until 1980.

Critical reception 
"The songs and the melodies" of the album reminded critics of Billboard magazine the works of Southside Johnny and the Asbury Jukes and they expressed the thought that future possible success of Jo Jo Zep's depend on their willingness to continue to follow this style.

Track listing (Original Australian version) 

Bonus live LP with original Australian issue:

Track listing (Revised US version) 
The US version, issued in 1980, dropped "You Made a Fool Out of Me" and added a newly-recorded studio version of "So Young".

Personnel
Jo Jo Zep & the Falcons
Joe Camilleri — vocals, saxophone, guitar
Jeff Burstin - guitar
Tony Faehse - guitar, backing vocals
John Power - bass, vocals
Gary Young - drums

Charts

References 

1979 albums
Jo Jo Zep & The Falcons albums
Mushroom Records albums